Dehan or Dahan may refer to:
 Dehan, Kerman
 Dehan, Razavi Khorasan
 Now Dehan ("New Dehan"), Razavi Khorasan Province